The Bull Arm Formation is a volcanic formation cropping out in Newfoundland, the youngest of the Musgravetown Group.  It is defined as everything between the first and last volcanic horizon, with a recognition that some sandstones will be interbedded, and its start and finish may vary across the region depending on how widespread volcanic horizons are in practice.

References

Ediacaran Newfoundland and Labrador